Van de Vendel or van de Vendel is a surname. Notable people with the surname include:

 Edward van de Vendel (born 1964), Dutch author of children's literature
 Theo van de Vendel (born 1980), Dutch Olympic eventing rider

Dutch-language surnames